Michel Serres (1 September 1930 – 1 June 2019) was a French philosopher, theorist and writer. His works explore themes of science, time and death, and later incorporated prose.

Life and career
The son of a bargeman, Serres entered France's naval academy, the École Navale, in 1949 and the École Normale Supérieure in 1952. He aggregated in 1955, having studied philosophy. He spent the next few years as a naval officer before finally receiving his doctorate (doctorat ès lettres) in 1968 from the University of Paris (with a thesis titled Le Système de Leibniz et ses modèles mathématiques), and began teaching in 1969 at the University of Paris I.

As a child, Serres witnessed firsthand the violence and devastation of war. "I was six for my first dead bodies," he told Bruno Latour. These formative experiences led him consistently to eschew scholarship based upon models of war, suspicion, and criticism.

Over the next twenty years, Serres earned a reputation as a spell-binding lecturer and as the author of remarkably beautiful and enigmatic prose so reliant on the sonorities of French that it is considered practically untranslatable. He took as his subjects such diverse topics as the mythical Northwest Passage, the concept of the parasite, and the explosion of the Space Shuttle Challenger. More generally Serres was interested in developing a philosophy of science which does not rely on a metalanguage in which a single account of science is privileged and regarded as accurate. To do this he relied on the concept of translation between accounts rather than settling on one as authoritative. For this reason Serres has relied on the figure of Hermes (in his earlier works) and angels (in more recent studies) as messengers who translate (or map) back and forth between domains (i.e., between maps).

In 1990, Serres was elected to the Académie française, in recognition of his position as one of France's most prominent intellectuals. He was an influence on intellectuals such as Bruno Latour, Robert Pogue Harrison, and Jonathan Bate. He served as a Professor of French at Stanford University.

His most enduring book is Le contrat naturel (1990), a highly prescient work addressing the need for philosophy to address the climate crisis.

In an interview with Hans Ulrich Obrist, Serres expressed interest in the emergence of a new political philosophy that addresses the digital context of the 21st century, "I think that out of this place of no law that is the Internet there will soon emerge a new law, completely different from that which organized our old metric space."

Serres was a vocal enthusiast for freely accessible knowledge, especially Wikipedia.

In 2012, Serres was awarded the Meister Eckhart Prize and in 2013 he was awarded the Dan David Prize. He died on 1 June 2019, at the age of 88.

Publications 

 1968: Le Système de Leibniz et ses modèles mathématiques, Presses universitaires de France, rééd. 1982 
 1969: Hermès I, la communication, Éditions de Minuit, reprint. 1984
 1972: Hermès II, l'interférence, Éditions de Minuit
 1974: Hermès III, la traduction, Éditions de Minuit
 1974: Jouvences. Sur Jules Verne, Éditions de Minuit
 1975: Auguste Comte. Leçons de philosophie positive, (in collaboration), tome I, Éditions Hermann
 1975: Esthétiques sur Carpaccio, Hermann
 1975: Feux et signaux de brume. Zola, Grasset, 
 1977: Hermès IV, La distribution, Éditions de Minuit, reprint. 1981
 1977: La Naissance de la physique dans le texte de Lucrèce, Éditions de Minuit
 1980: Hermès V, Le passage du Nord-ouest, Éditions de Minuit, Paris
 1980: Le Parasite, Grasset
 1982: Genèse, Grasset
 1983: Détachement, Flammarion
 1983: Rome. Le livre des fondations, Grasset
 1985: Les Cinq Sens, Grasset; reprint. Fayard, 2014
 1987: L'Hermaphrodite, Flammarion
 1987: Statues, François Bourin
 1989: Éléments d'histoire des sciences, (in collaboration), Bordas
 1990: Le Contrat naturel, François Bourin, Paris (The Natural Contract (1995), University of Michigan Press (English translation by Elizabeth MacArthur and William Paulson)
 1991: Le Tiers-instruit, François Bourin
 1991: Discours de réception de Michel Serres à l'Académie française et réponse de Bertrand Poirot-Delpech, François Bourin
 1992: Éclaircissements, (interviews with Bruno Latour), François Bourin
 1993: La Légende des Anges, Flammarion
 1993: Les Origines de la géométrie, Flammarion
 1994: Atlas, Julliard
 1995: Éloge de la philosophie en langue française, Fayard
 1997: Nouvelles du monde, Flammarion
 1997: Le trésor. Dictionnaire des sciences, (in collaboration), Flammarion, Paris
 1997: À visage différent, (in collaboration), Hermann
 1999: Paysages des sciences, (in collaboration), Le Pommier
 2000: Hergé, mon ami, Éditions Moulinsart
 2001: Hominescence, Le Pommier
 2002: Variations sur le corps, Le Pommier, 1999; édition texte seul, Le Pommier
 2002: Conversations, Jules Verne, la science et l'homme contemporain, 1re version, Revue Jules Verne 13/14, Centre international Jules-Verne, Amiens
 2003: L'Incandescent, Le Pommier
 2003: Jules Verne, la science et l'homme contemporain, Le Pommier
 2004: Rameaux, Le Pommier
 2006: Récits d'humanisme, Le Pommier
 2006: Petites chroniques du dimanche soir, Le Pommier
 2006: L'Art des ponts : homo pontifex, Le Pommier
 2007: Le Tragique et la Pitié. Discours de réception de René Girard à l'Académie française et réponse de Michel Serres, Le Pommier
 2007: Petites chroniques du dimanche soir 2, Le Pommier
 2007: Carpaccio, les esclaves libérés, Le Pommier
 2008: Le Mal propre : polluer pour s'approprier ?, Le Pommier, coll. « Manifestes »
 2008: La Guerre mondiale, Le Pommier
 2009: Écrivains, savants et philosophes font le tour du monde, Le Pommier, coll. « Les Essais »
 2009: Temps des crises, Le Pommier, coll. « Manifestes », 
 2009: Van Cleef et Arpels, Le Temps poétique, with Franco Cologni and Jean-Claude Sabrier, Cercle d'Art, coll. « La collection »
 2009: Petites chroniques du dimanche soir 3, Le Pommier
 2010: Biogée, Éditions-dialogues.fr/Le Pommier
 2011: Musique, Éditions Le Pommier 
 2012: Petite Poucette, Éditions Le Pommier 
 2012: Andromaque, veuve noire, Éditions de l’Herne
 2013: Les Temps nouveaux (coffret), Le Pommier
 2014: Pantopie, de Hermès à Petite Poucette (avec Martin Legros et Sven Ortoli), Le Pommier
 2014: Petites Chroniques du dimanche tome VI, Le Pommier
 2014: Yeux, Le Pommier 
 2015: Le gaucher boiteux : puissance de la pensée, Le Pommier
 2015: Écrivains, savants et philosophes font le tour du monde, Le Pommier
 2015: Du bonheur, aujourd'hui (with Michel Polacco), Le Pommier
 2015: Solitude. Dialogue sur l'engagement (with Jean-François Serres), Le Pommier
 2016: De l'impertinence, aujourd'hui (with Michel Polacco), Le Pommier
 2016 : Darwin, Bonaparte et le Samaritain : une philosophie de l'histoire, Paris, Le Pommier
 2017 :  De l'Amitié, aujourd'hui (avec Michel Polacco), Paris, Le Pommier
 2017 : C'était mieux avant !, Paris, Le Pommier
 2018 : Défense et illustration de la langue française aujourd'hui, (avec Michel Polacco), Paris, Le Pommier
 2019 : Morales espiègles, Paris, Le Pommier

Notes

References
 Alan D. Schrift (2006), Twentieth-Century French Philosophy: Key Themes and Thinkers, Blackwell Publishing.

External links
 
 Online Collaboration regarding Serres work
 art, writing: michel serres (1995) Interview with Serres by Hari Kunzru including a brief exchange on the relationship of Serres to Deleuze.
 Steven Connor's website, with links to his writing on Serres
  Radio Interview by Robert P. Harrison
  L'Académie française
 Michel Serres talks to François-Bernard Huyghe in the Unesco Courier
  Serres speaking about wikipedia very enthusiastically
 Michel Serres, one of France's 'immortels,' tells the 'grand récit' at Stanford by Cynthia Haven, Stanford Report, May 27, 2009.
 issuu.com
Obituary in Radical Philosophy Autumn 2019 by Lucie Kim-Chi Mercier

1930 births
2019 deaths
20th-century French philosophers
21st-century French philosophers
Continental philosophers
École Normale Supérieure alumni
University of Paris alumni
Members of the Académie Française
Members of the European Academy of Sciences and Arts
People from Agen
People from Vincennes
Philosophers of science
Stanford University Department of French and Italian faculty
Academic staff of Pantheon-Sorbonne University
French male non-fiction writers
Winners of the Prix Broquette-Gonin (literature)
Prix Médicis essai winners
Grand Officiers of the Légion d'honneur
Grand Cross of the Ordre national du Mérite